Rosario is an unincorporated community in San Juan County, in the U.S. state of Washington.

History
A post office called Rosario was established in 1906, and remained in operation until 1954. The community takes its name from nearby Rosario Strait.

See also 

 List of unincorporated communities in Washington

References

Unincorporated communities in San Juan County, Washington
Unincorporated communities in Washington (state)